The Polar Research Institute of China (PRIC) is the main Chinese research institute for the study of Earth's polar regions. It is based in Shanghai, China.

The Institute manages five polar research stations (four in Antarctica and one in the Arctic), as well as the icebreaking research vessels Xuě Lóng and Xuě Lóng 2.

Stations

See also 

 Arctic policy of China
 Chinese Arctic and Antarctic Administration
 Xuě Lóng

References

External links 
 

 
Research institutes in China
Earth science research institutes
Organizations based in Shanghai
Antarctic research
Arctic research